Panoquina ocola, the ocola skipper or long-winged skipper, is a species of butterfly of the family Hesperiidae. It is found in Paraguay north through tropical America and the West Indies to south Texas, and strays occur north to southeast Arizona, Kansas, Illinois, Michigan, southern Ontario, and New York.

The wingspan is 35–43 mm.

The larvae feed on Oryza sativa, Saccharum officinarum and Hymenachne amplexicaulis.

Subspecies
Panoquina ocola ocola (Florida to Ohio, Mexico to Brazil, Argentina, Venezuela to Peru, Suriname)
Panoquina ocola distipuncta Johnson & Matusik, 1988 (Dominican Republic)

References

Butterflies described in 1863
Butterflies of North America
Panoquina
Hesperiidae of South America
Taxa named by William Chapman Hewitson